The 2010 Diamond Head Classic was a mid-season eight-team college basketball tournament played on December 22, 23, and 25 at the Stan Sheriff Center in Honolulu, Hawaii. It was the second annual Diamond Head Classic tournament and was part of the 2010–11 NCAA Division I men's basketball season. Butler defeated Washington State to win the tournament championship. Matt Howard was named the tournament's MVP.

Bracket

All-tournament team

Source

References

Diamond Head Classic
Diamond Head Classic
2010 in sports in Hawaii